Euilly-et-Lombut is a commune in the Ardennes department and Grand Est region of north-eastern France.

The fortress of Euilly-et-Lombut, which was mostly destroyed in the 18th century, is known as one of the Quatre Filles d'Yvois (four daughters of Yvois).  Nowadays, there are only two towers remaining.

Population

See also
Communes of the Ardennes department

References

Communes of Ardennes (department)
Ardennes communes articles needing translation from French Wikipedia